Steven Torriano Berry is an  American film producer, writer and director.  He directed  Noh Matta Wat!, the first Belizean dramatic television series, which first aired on November 28, 2005.

Background and career
A native of Kansas City, Kansas, Berry was raised in Des Moines, Iowa.  After receiving his Bachelor's degree at Arizona State University, he entered the Master's program at UCLA's prestigious film school.  While at UCLA, Berry worked on numerous film and video projects including an award-winning short, Rich, in which he wrote, produced and directed as well as starred. On October 21, 2011, Rich was screened as part of a major film retrospective, "L.A. Rebellion:Creating a New Black Cinema," part of Pacific Standard Time:Art in L.A. 1945-1980.

Berry is currently an associate professor at Howard University in Washington, D.C., where he directed the Indie horror film, The Embalmer. It is considered one of the earliest examples of the "urban horror film."  He is also the author of two books on black film.

Berry is a member of Omega Psi Phi fraternity.

His latest project is The Kusini Concept: The Pride and the Sabotage, a documentary about the making of the film Countdown at Kusini.

Film credits
 Black Independent Showcase, WHMM-TV 32, Washington D.C.
 The Black Beyond Anthology Series
 The Light (half-hour TV movie), WPVI-TV 6, Philadelphia
 When It's Your Turn, WPVI Philadelphia
 The Embalmer
 Noh Matta Wat! (TV series), Belize (Channel 5/7/Krem Television)
 The Kusini Concept: The Pride and Sabotage" (documentary)

Awards and recognition
 1983: 2nd Place, Black American Cinema Society Award for Rich 1985: Honorable Mention, Black American Cinema Society Award for In the Hole 1990: First Place, Black American Cinema Society Award for The Light''
 Black Horror Movie Hall of Fame

References

External links

S. Torriano Berry Collection at Indiana University Bloomington Black Film Center/Archive
 Steve Berry at NohMattaWat.com

1958 births
Living people
Writers from Kansas City, Kansas
Writers from Des Moines, Iowa
African-American film directors
American male screenwriters
Belizean media personalities
Arizona State University alumni
L.A. Rebellion
UCLA Film School alumni
University of Iowa alumni
Film directors from Iowa
Film directors from Kansas
Screenwriters from Iowa
Screenwriters from Arizona
Screenwriters from Kansas
20th-century African-American people
21st-century African-American people